Shahid Ali Khan (Urdu: شاہد علی خان) (born 26 December 1964) is a retired field hockey goalkeeper from  Pakistan, who won the gold medal with the Men's National Team at the 1984 Summer Olympics in Los Angeles and later became the Pakistan's goal keeping coach. 

Eight years later, he earned the bronze medal in Barcelona, Spain. At the age of 18, in 1982, he saved a penalty stroke to save Pakistan from defeat in the Final of World Cup. He was considered a top goalkeeper in field hockey, and was capped 135 times.

See also
 Pakistan Hockey Federation

References

External links
 

1964 births
Pakistani male field hockey players
Olympic field hockey players of Pakistan
Field hockey players at the 1984 Summer Olympics
Field hockey players at the 1992 Summer Olympics
Olympic gold medalists for Pakistan
Olympic bronze medalists for Pakistan
Living people
Muhajir people
Olympic medalists in field hockey
Recipients of the Pride of Performance
Medalists at the 1984 Summer Olympics
Medalists at the 1992 Summer Olympics
Asian Games gold medalists for Pakistan
Medalists at the 1982 Asian Games
Medalists at the 1990 Asian Games
Asian Games medalists in field hockey
Field hockey players at the 1982 Asian Games
Field hockey players at the 1990 Asian Games
20th-century Pakistani people